The Asahi was a Japanese-Canadian baseball team of amateur and semi-professional players that was based in Vancouver from 1914 to 1941. The team won many league championships, particularly in the 1930s.

History

The team was based in Vancouver's Oppenheimer Park—originally known as the Powell Street Grounds—in the city's Japantown. Matsujiro Miyazaki, a Powell Street shop owner, was the team's first manager. The team's championships included the International League (1919), Terminal League (1926, 1930), and Burrard League (1938–1940). The team was disbanded when its members were dispersed across Canada due to the internment of Japanese Canadians during World War II.

Legacy
The team was inducted into the Canadian Baseball Hall of Fame in 2003, and the BC Sports Hall of Fame in 2005. The team was designated an Event of National Historic Significance on August 26, 2008. A plaque honoring the team was unveiled in Oppenheimer Park on September 18, 2011, the 70th anniversary of the team's last game. On April 24, 2019, the team was honoured with a postage stamp issued by Canada Post.

In media
In December 2014, a Japanese studio released a period drama movie called The Vancouver Asahi starring Satoshi Tsumabuki and Kazuya Kamenashi.

A 2003 documentary about the team, Sleeping Tigers: The Asahi Baseball Story, was directed by Jari Osborne. Produced by the National Film Board of Canada, the documentary combines archival film and dramatic recreations, along with interviews with the last of the Asahi. The 50-minute film garnered four awards including a Rockie Award for Best Sports Program at the Banff Television Festival and a Golden Sheaf Award.

Heart of a Champion is a 2016 novel by Ellen Schwartz. The story is about a boy named Kenji "Kenny" Sakamoto who aspires to be a baseball player for the Vancouver Asahi, but his dreams were crushed when the Canadian government issued an order for all Japanese Canadians to be placed in internment camps, then got permission to clear the land and make a baseball field. The novel has won a Silver Birch Award. 

On February 19, 2019, a Heritage Minute was released, depicting an Asahi baseball game and the subsequent internment of a player alongside other Japanese Canadians. The short segment was narrated by the last surviving member of the team, Koichi Kaye Kaminishi, and novelist Joy Kogawa.

Notes

References

Further reading

2003 Vancouver Sun article

External links
Virtual Museum of Canada: Asahi Canadian Baseball Legends via Wayback Machine
Sleeping Tigers: The Asahi Baseball Story at NFB.ca (full video)

Box score of the team's last game (September 18, 1941) via newspapers.com

Baseball teams in Vancouver
Defunct baseball teams in Canada
Canadian sportspeople of Japanese descent
Internment of Japanese Canadians
Baseball teams in British Columbia
1914 establishments in British Columbia
Baseball teams established in 1914
1941 disestablishments in British Columbia
Baseball teams disestablished in 1941
Canadian Baseball Hall of Fame inductees